Platanthera ciliaris, commonly known as the yellow fringed orchid, yellow-fringed orchid, or orange-fringed orchid, is a large and showy species of orchid. It grows in "acid soil of hillside seepage bogs" in the longleaf pine landscapes of the Gulf Coast of the United States. Like many species in these habitats, including flatwoods, it is dependent upon recurring fire to create open conditions.  Further north it is found in bogs, but even here it may be dependent upon fire to create open conditions.

It is pollinated by large butterflies, mostly swallowtails.

The species is at risk in some areas from loss of habitat and collecting.  For example, it is endangered in Michigan.  It has been recorded from extreme southern Ontario, but is now thought to be extirpated.

References

ciliaris
Orchids of the United States
Plants described in 1753
Taxa named by Carl Linnaeus